George Howard "Jake" Northrop (March 5, 1888 – November 16, 1945) nicknamed "Jerky",   was a pitcher in Major League Baseball. He played for the Boston Braves.

References

External links

1888 births
1945 deaths
Major League Baseball pitchers
Boston Braves players
Baseball players from Pennsylvania
Trenton Tigers players
Reading Pretzels players
Louisville Colonels (minor league) players
Indianapolis Indians players
Milwaukee Brewers (minor league) players
Columbus Senators players
People from Bradford County, Pennsylvania